The Smoke-Free Air Act is a smoking ban that came into effect in New Jersey, United States, on April 15, 2006. This law prohibits smoking in most indoor public places and work places.

Exemptions
Casino floors
Cigar bars and lounges which make 15% of their income from tobacco products.
Tobacco retail establishments.
Up to 20% of the rooms in a hotel or motel.

Penalties
A person or business in violation of the law:
$250 first offense
$500 second offense
$1000 for each subsequent offense

Smoke-free casinos
The Act exempted casinos from the ban for an earlier version of the Act without the casino exemption was repealed. For anti-smoking groups are still seeking to remove the casino exemption, the Atlantic City Council passed local ordinance #86, an ordinance that restricts smoking within casinos to only 25% of the casino floor.

See also
 List of smoking bans in the United States

References

External links
NJDHSS website for the Smoke-Free Air Act

New Jersey statutes
Tobacco control
Smoking in the United States
2006 in American law
2006 in New Jersey
Health in New Jersey